Chidi Anthony Okezie (born August 8, 1993) is a US-born sprinter of Nigerian and Jamaican descent. Okezie is competing internationally for Nigeria. He is a two-time African Championships bronze medallist in the 400 metres.

Personal
His father, Moses Okezie is Nigerian and his mother Carol Morris is Jamaican. He has nine siblings. He graduated from Hampton University in 2015 and has a Master's in Sports Administration.

Career
Okezie was part of the American 4 × 400 m relay team that won a gold medal at the 2012 World Junior Championships in Athletics in Barcelona.

He represented Nigeria at the 2018 Commonwealth Games and reached the semifinals of the 400 m. He also ran the anchor leg for the country in the 4 x 400 metres relay heats. The team finished second but were eventually disqualified for a lane infringement. 

The 2018 African Championships were a success for Okezie. He won an individual bronze medal in the 400 metres behind Baboloki Thebe and Thapelo Phora. This made him a two-time African Championships bronze medallist as he had won a bronze medal at the 2016 Championships in Durban. He later anchored the Nigerian 4 x 400 m relay team to a bronze medal behind Kenya and South Africa. Okezie was also a member of the African quartet that placed second in the mixed 4 x 400 m relay at the 2018 IAAF Continental Cup.

In 2019, he won the bronze medal in the men's 4 × 400 metres relay at the 2019 African Games held in Rabat, Morocco. He also won the bronze medal in the men's 400 metres.

His personal best in the 400 metres is 45.24 s which he set at the 2018 Culturama Games in Nevis.

Competition record

National Titles

400 metres: 2015

Personal bests
Outdoor
400 metres – 45.24 (Nevis, 2018)

Indoor
200 metres – 21.02 (Boston 2016)
400 metres – 46.48 (Boston 2016)

References

External links

DyeStat profile for Chidi Okezie
Hampton Pirates bio

1993 births
Living people
Track and field athletes from Philadelphia
American male sprinters
Nigerian male sprinters
American people of Nigerian descent
American sportspeople of Jamaican descent
Athletes (track and field) at the 2018 Commonwealth Games
Athletes (track and field) at the 2019 African Games
African Games medalists in athletics (track and field)
African Games bronze medalists for Nigeria
Commonwealth Games competitors for Nigeria